The Lancers in Italy during the Second World War' is a brief combat history of the British Queen's Royal Lancers during the Italian campaign

In May 1943, after the successful North African campaign, the 16th/5th Queen's Royal Lancers and the 17/21st Lancers as part of the 26th Armoured Brigade of the 6th Armoured Division moved to Italy .
Both regiments found it difficult terrain for tanks and armoured vehicles. At times, the Lancers had to revert to an infantry role. The 16/5th Lancers distinguished itself at Piuarola, playing a major part for the Liberation of Rome.

On 18 April 1945 both Lancer regiments broke out of Argenta with the 17/21st Lancers passing through the 16/5th Lancers and capturing a bridge at Segni, seven miles ahead. They found the bridge blown and had to find an alternative route.  They located a bridge intact at Gallo and were told to push onto Poggio Renatico. The Germans withdrew north of the Po River.

On 2 May the Germans surrendered to the Allies, ending the Italy campaign.

References 

British Army in World War II